Edmonton—St. Albert was a federal electoral district in Alberta, Canada, that was represented in the House of Commons of Canada from 2004 to 2015.

Geography
The riding included the city of St. Albert and the neighbourhoods of Elsinore, Baturyn, Canossa, Lorelei, Beaumaris, Dunluce, Oxford, Griesbach, Carlisle, Caernarvon, Baranow, Cumberland, The Palisades, Pembina, Mooncrest Park, Wellington, Athlone, Kensington, Calder, Rosslyn and Lauderdale in the City of Edmonton.

History
The electoral district was created in 2003 from Edmonton North, St. Albert, and a small part of Edmonton West ridings.

Member of Parliament

This riding has elected the following Members of Parliament:

Elections results

See also
 List of Canadian federal electoral districts
 Past Canadian electoral districts

References

Notes

External links
 
 Expenditures - 2008
 Expenditures - 2004
 Website of the Parliament of Canada

Former federal electoral districts of Alberta
Politics of Edmonton
Politics of St. Albert, Alberta